The Kansas Lottery 200 is a NASCAR Camping World Truck Series race held at Kansas Speedway in Kansas City, Kansas. The race, which is held on the same weekend as the NASCAR Cup Series' playoff race at the track, was initially added to the series' schedule in 2020 after the COVID-19 pandemic resulted in the cancellation of the series' race at Eldora Speedway in Ohio. It then became a permanent race on the Truck Series schedule in 2022 and replaced the fall race at Las Vegas Motor Speedway.

Past winners

2020: Race extended due to a NASCAR Overtime finish.

Manufacturer wins

References

External links
 

2020 establishments in Kansas
 
NASCAR Truck Series races
Recurring sporting events established in 2020
Annual sporting events in the United States